Acanthoderes jaspideus is a species of beetle in the family Cerambycidae. It was described by Germar in 1823.

References

Aegomorphus
Beetles described in 1823